Steven Gluckstern (May 1, 1951 – May 29, 2022) was an American entrepreneur. He was the first chairman of the Democracy Alliance.

References

1951 births
2022 deaths
American businesspeople